Ali Ardeshir Larijani (born 3 June 1957) is an Iranian conservative politician, philosopher and former military officer in the Islamic Revolutionary Guard Corps, who served as the Speaker of the Parliament of Iran from 2008 to 2020. He is currently member of the Expediency Discernment Council.

Larijani was the Secretary of the Supreme National Security Council from 15 August 2005 to 20 October 2007, appointed to the position by President Mahmoud Ahmadinejad, replacing Hassan Rouhani. Acceptance of Larijani's resignation from the secretary position was announced on 20 October 2007 by Gholam-Hossein Elham, the Iranian government's spokesman, mentioning that his previous resignations were turned down by President Ahmadinejad.

Larijani was one of the two representatives of the Supreme Leader of the Islamic Revolution Ali Khamenei to the council, the other being Hassan Rouhani. In his post as secretary, he effectively functioned as the top negotiator on issues of national security, including Iran's nuclear program. He is also the current member of Supreme Council of the Cultural Revolution.

Early life
Ali Larijani was born in Najaf to Iranian parents. He hails from a religious family based in Amol in the province of Mazandaran. His father was a leading cleric, Ayatollah Mirza Hashem Amoli. His parents moved to Najaf in 1931 due to pressure of then ruler Reza Shah, but returned to Iran in 1961.

Education
Larijani is a graduate of Qom seminary. He also holds a Bachelor of Science degree in computer science and mathematics from Aryamehr University of Technology and holds a master's degree and PhD in Western philosophy from the University of Tehran. Initially, he wanted to continue his graduate studies in computer science, but changed his subject after consultation with Morteza Motahhari. Larijani has published books on Immanuel Kant, Saul Kripke, and David Lewis. Larijani is a faculty member of  the School of Literature and Humanities at the University of Tehran.

Career
Larijani is a former commander of the Revolutionary Guards. Larijani served as the deputy minister of labour and social affairs and then was appointed deputy minister of information and communications technology. In March 1994, he was appointed as head of the Islamic Republic of Iran Broadcasting, replacing Mohammad Hashemi Rafsanjani in the post. He was in office until 21 July 2004 and was succeeded by Ezzatollah Zarghami after serving ten years in the post. He became security adviser to Supreme Leader Ayatollah Ali Khamenei in August 2004.

Larijani was a presidential candidate for the 2005 presidential elections, where he ranked sixth, winning 5.94% of the votes. He was considered the most important presidential candidate of the conservative alliance for the 2005 presidential elections. He was supported by the Islamic Society of Engineers (ISE), among other conservative groups. He had been announced as the final choice of the conservative Council for Coordination of the Forces of the Revolution, which was made from representatives of some influential conservative parties and organizations. However, he proved to be the least popular of the three conservative candidates, the others being Mahmoud Ahmadinejad (second rank in the first round, winner in the second round) and Mohammad Bagher Ghalibaf (fourth rank in the first round).

In 2005, Larijani was appointed secretary of the Supreme National Security Council, a body which helps draw up nuclear and other policies, by Khamenei. He replaced Hassan Rouhani in the post. As chief nuclear negotiator, Iranian analysts said he differed with the president over how to pursue negotiations with his European counterparts and say he backed a more pragmatic approach.

As Iran's top nuclear envoy, Larijani said on 25 April 2007 that he expected "new ideas" from senior EU official Javier Solana at talks on resolving the deadlock between Tehran's refusal to freeze its nuclear programme and United Nations Security Council demands that it do so.

In the March 2008 parliamentary election, Larijani won a seat from Qom. He said that he was willing to work with Ahmadinejad; according to Larijani, he did not disagree with Ahmadinejad on ideological issues and they had only "differences in style". In May 2008, Larijani became speaker of the parliament. He was reelected in next years as chairman of the parliament. He was re-elected in 2012 elections as the Qom district's high receiving candidate. He was also elected for another term as chairman of the parliament on 5 June 2012, and was sworn in on 11 June 2012.

Larijani implied on 21 June 2009 that authorities took the side of one candidate, without clarifying which candidate.
Just after the election, Larijani reportedly congratulated presidential candidate Mir Hossein Mousavi as he, having "access to firsthand and classified information and news", believed Mousavi had won the election. However, on 22 October 2012, during a QA meeting with the students of Iran University of Science and Technology, Larijani denied the allegations that he had congratulated Mousavi. He was elected as speaker in the new Majlis in May 2016.

In May 2021, Larijani declared his bid for presidency in the 2021 Iranian presidential election. However, the vetting Guardian Council, in a decision that astounded both the conservatives and reformists, disqualified him from running. Considering Larijani's long career as an Islamic Republic insider who has been part of the top echelons of power since the 1979 revolution, his disqualification was a possibility even his staunch detractors couldn't envision. The reason for barring him was not announced by the Guardian Council.

Affiliation 
Larijani was considered to maintain Motalefeh membership and views while in Hashemi Rafsanjani cabinet (1992–1994). Iranian scholar Mehdi Moslem in his 2002 book named Factional Politics in Post-Khomeini Iran, suggests that Larijani had been a member of Motalefeh and part of the ‘traditional right’. Payam Mohseni, a fellow at the Belfer Center for Science and International Affairs, classifies Larijani as a lead figure in the ‘theocratic right’ camp, whose other prominent are Mahmoud Hashemi Shahroudi and Mohammad Reza Mahdavi Kani.

Larijani was one of the leaders of the Principlists Pervasive Coalition in 2008 parliamentary elections, and a United Front of Principlists leader. During Iranian 2016 parliamentary election Larijani was the leader of the Followers of Wilayat faction, although he was backed by the reformist List of Hope and said he is running as an independent candidate.

He is also described as a center-right politician who has "slowly distanced himself from the Principlist camp" and a "conservative-turned-moderate".

Larijani is known to have close associates, including the interior minister Abdolreza Rahmani Fazli, Behrouz Nemati, spokesman for the parliament's presiding board, and Kazem Jalali, head of the parliament's research center.

Electoral history

Public image
According to a poll conducted in March 2016 by Information and Public Opinion Solutions LLC (iPOS) among Iranian citizens, Larijani has 45% approval and 34% disapproval ratings and thus a +11% net popularity; while 11% of voters do not recognize the name.

Personal life
Larijani is a brother of Sadegh Larijani (President of the Judicature), Mohammad-Javad Larijani, Bagher Larijani (Chancellor of Tehran University of Medical Sciences), and Fazel Larijani (Iran's former cultural attachée in Ottawa). Larijani is also a cousin of Ahmad Tavakkoli (Larijani's and Tavakkoli's mothers are sisters). Larijani is the son-in-law of Ayatollah Morteza Motahhari, His daughter, Fatemeh Ardeshir-Larijani, studies at the University Hospitals Cleveland Medical Center in the United States.

On 2 April 2020, Larijani tested positive for coronavirus (COVID-19) and placed in quarantine.

References

Further reading
 Fischbach, Michael B. ed. Bbiographical encyclopedia of the modern Middle East and North Africa (Gale, 2 vol, 2008) 2: 469–470.

External links
 
 

1957 births
Living people
Sharif University of Technology alumni
University of Tehran alumni
Iranian expatriates in Iraq
Mazandarani people
People from Najaf
People from Amol
Islamic Revolutionary Guard Corps brigadier generals
Government ministers of Iran
Candidates for President of Iran
Speakers of the Islamic Consultative Assembly
Iranian nuclear negotiators
Members of the Expediency Discernment Council
Deputies of Qom
Members of the 9th Islamic Consultative Assembly
Members of the 8th Islamic Consultative Assembly
Members of the 10th Islamic Consultative Assembly
Followers of Wilayat fraction members
Representatives of the Supreme Leader
Islamic Coalition Party politicians
Faculty of Letters and Humanities of the University of Tehran alumni